The Women's 100 metres T38 event at the 2016 Summer Paralympics took place at the Rio Olympic Stadium on 8 and 9 September. It featured 16 athletes from 11 countries.

The event is for athletes with the lowest level of disability in the cerebral palsy class.

Heats
In the heats, the first three in each race, and the 2 fastest losers overall qualify for the final.

Heat 1

Heat 2

Final

References

Athletics at the 2016 Summer Paralympics
2016 in women's athletics